One Way or Another is a Spanish comedy television series created, written and directed by Manuela Burló Moreno which stars Marta Martín and Saida Benzal. Produced by LACOproductora and Globomedia (The Mediapro Studio) for HBO Europe, it was released on 22 July 2020.

Premise 
The fiction concerns the reunion of Hache (H) and Belén (B), two women native from Parla (a suburb of Madrid), 5 years after the events dealt with in the short film Pipas. Belén has moved to Malasaña. Amid cultural conflict and misunderstandings galore in an environment alien to them, Hache and Belén try to resume their friendship. The series prominently portraits the culture of the so-called postureo.

Cast 
 Marta Martín as Hache (Herminia).
 Saida Benzal as Belén.
 Brays Efe as Oli.
 Itziar Castro as Choni.
 .
 Fernando Albizu.
 Ernesto Sevilla.

Production and release 
Consisting of 10 episodes featuring a running time of around 30 minutes, the series began filming in Madrid towards May 2019. It was released on 22 July 2020.

Awards and nominations 

|-
| align = "center" | 2021 || 8th  || Best Comedy Actress || Saida Benzal ||  || 
|}

References 

2020 Spanish television series debuts
2020s Spanish comedy television series
Television shows set in Madrid
Television shows filmed in Spain
Spanish-language television shows
Works about friendship
HBO Europe original programming
Television series by Globomedia
Television series by LACOproductora